King Arthur and His Knights of the Round Table is a retelling of the Arthurian legends, principally Thomas Malory's Le Morte d'Arthur, by Roger Lancelyn Green. It was intended for a child audience. It was first published by Puffin Books in 1953 and has since been reprinted many times. In 2008, it was reissued in the Puffin Classics series with an introduction by David Almond (the award-winning author of Clay, Skellig, Kit's Wilderness, and The Fire-Eaters), and the original illustrations by Lotte Reiniger.

Composition

Green set out to weave together the many legends surrounding King Arthur into a single narrative. Thinking that Malory's work was more of a loose collection of separate stories. Green attempted to tell a cohesive story with  beginning, middle, and end. He drew from many other medieval sources, but mainly Malory, particularly so in the last section of the book.

Synopsis

Uther Pendragon, king of Britons, and defender of Britain against the Saxons has died. On Christmas Day, Merlin the magician gathers many knights outside a church. A sword, stuck fast to an anvil, in turn on top of a marble stone, appears. No knight can remove the sword from the anvil.

After many years, the young Arthur, secretly the son of Uther Pendragon, pulls the sword out of the stone. He becomes king. With the guidance of Merlin, he constructs a round table, at which only the best knights of Britain may sit. More and more knights come to join the brotherhood of the Round Table, and each has his own adventures.

Eventually, the holy knight Galahad, the son of Sir Lancelot, comes to Arthur's court. With his coming, all the knights ride throughout Europe in search of the Holy Grail of Jesus Christ. Only five knights see the Grail; Sir Lancelot, Sir Percival, Sir Bors de Gaunnes, Sir Galahad, and Sir Gawain.

After the Grail is found, the last battle of the Knights of the Round Table is fought. In this battle many knights die and with them King Arthur, sir Gawain, who is Arthur's nephew, and Mordred, the wicked son of king Arthur and his half-sister Morgana le Fay. King Arthur is taken away to Avalon, a secret island after he is terribly wounded by Mordred while he was making the final stab with his sword to kill Mordred.

See also 
 
 The Boy's King Arthur — a different children's edition that was published under this name

References

1953 British novels
British children's novels
Children's fantasy novels
Modern Arthurian fiction
1953 children's books
Puffin Books books